John Henry Douglas (June 22, 1851 – December 12, 1930) was a farmer and politician in Ontario, Canada. He represented Northumberland East in the Legislative Assembly of Ontario from 1898 to 1902 as a Liberal.

The son of Donald Douglas and Elizabeth Waters, he was born in Warkworth, Canada West. In 1880, he married Clara Jane Boyce. His election in 1898 was declared void but he was reelected in a by-election held in December later that same year.

References

External links

1851 births
1930 deaths
Ontario Liberal Party MPPs